Zafer Kalaycıoğlu (born 1 March 1965 Kayseri, Turkey) is a Turkish professional basketball coach. He is currently coaching the Turkish pro side Botaş SK.

Managing career
 1994–1996 Galatasaray
 2000–2009 Fenerbahçe
 2009–2010 Galatasaray
 2010–2012 Mersin Büyükşehir Belediyespor
 2012 Samsun Basketbol
 2014–2015 Hatay Büyükşehir Belediyespor
 2015–2016 Mersin Büyükşehir Belediyespor
 2016–2018 Yakın Doğu Üniversitesi
 2020–present Botaş

Honors

Galatasaray
Turkish Championship
Winners (2): 1995, 1996
Turkish Cup
Winners (3): 1995, 1996, 2010
Turkish Presidents Cup
Winners (2): 1994, 1995

Fenerbahçe
Turkish Championship
Winners (5): 2002, 2004, 2006, 2007, 2008
Turkish Cup
Winners (6): 2001, 2004, 2005, 2006, 2007, 2008
Turkish Presidents Cup
Winners (5): 2000, 2001, 2004, 2005, 2007

Yakın Doğu Üniversitesi
EuroCup Women
Winners (1): 2017
Turkish Championship
Winners (1): 2017
Turkish Cup
Winners (2): 2017, 2018
Turkish Presidents Cup
Winners (1): 2017

References

1965 births
Living people
Turkish men's basketball players
Turkish basketball coaches
Galatasaray S.K. (women's basketball) coaches
Fenerbahçe basketball coaches
Turkish women's basketball coaches
People from Kayseri